The Asan Memorial Senior Secondary School is a Central Board of Secondary Education (CBSE) affiliated school located at Anderson Road, Cochin House, Egmore in Chennai - 600006. It is recognized as the first CBSE school in Chennai. It is ranked as one of the best CBSE schools in Chennai ever since its inception and produces regional toppers in 10th and 12th board exams every single year.

History
It was established in 1966 and is recognized as the first CBSE school in Chennai. It was founded in memory of the renowned Malayalam poet Mahakavi Kumaran Asan and is run by the Asan Memorial Association.

The group has various other educational institutions including Asan Memorial Matriculation Higher Secondary School, Kumaran Asan Memorial Higher Secondary School, AKG Public School, Asan Business School, Asan Memorial College of Engineering and Technology, Asan Memorial Dental College and Hospital, Asan Memorial College of Arts & Science, Asan Institute of Management and Asan Memorial Institute of Hotel Management and Catering Technology.

Notable alumni
 Ajith Kumar film actor
 P. Unnikrishnan Singer
 Ajay Vidyasagar Managing Director - Google Asia Pacific

References

Private schools in Chennai
High schools and secondary schools in Chennai
Primary schools in Tamil Nadu
High schools and secondary schools in Tamil Nadu
Educational institutions established in 1966
1966 establishments in Madras State